Adam Lindgren (born 28 March 1993), known by his handle Armada, is a Swedish professional Super Smash Bros. player from Gothenburg. He is widely considered one of the greatest Super Smash Bros. Melee players of all time and the greatest Melee Peach player of all time. Lindgren has won several major tournaments: he is a three-time champion of GENESIS, two-time champion of EVO, two-time champion of Apex and one-time champion of The Big House. Considered one of the "Five Gods" of Melee, alongside Jason "Mew2King" Zimmerman, Joseph "Mango" Marquez, Juan "Hungrybox" DeBiedma, and Kevin "PPMD" Nanney, Lindgren was ranked one of the top two Melee players in the world every year from the beginning of formal rankings in 2013 until his retirement from singles tournaments in 2018, with Lindgren ranked as the number one Melee player in the world in 2015 and 2016. A 2021 list by PGstats ranked Lindgren as the second-greatest Melee player of all time. Lindgren retired from professional Melee singles tournaments in September 2018, citing declining interest in the game, although he still occasionally enters doubles tournaments teaming with his brother Andreas "Android" Lindgren. He also runs a YouTube channel with over 125,000 subscribers.

He uses Peach and Fox, and formerly used Young Link as a secondary character. Lindgren rose to fame playing Peach exclusively, but he added Fox as a secondary in early 2015 in order to deal with a select few opponents. He is also considered one of the best doubles players in the world and is famous for teaming with both of his brothers Andreas "Android" and Alexander "Aniolas" Lindgren, as well as with Mew2King. Lindgren has also played Super Smash Bros. Ultimate and Project M competitively, primarily playing Inkling in the former and Peach and Pit in the latter. Lindgren has been nicknamed the Swedish Sniper.

Since 2019, Lindgren has shifted his focus entirely away from competition. Since 2020, he has instead focused on speedrunning the game Super Mario 64 and livestreaming on Twitch.

Gaming career

Competitive Smash Bros. career

Lindgren started his gaming career in 2003 competing in the Swedish Nintendo Championship.
Armada came to prominence in 2007 finishing 4th at The Renaissance of Smash 4, his first national tournament. Seven months later, he finished 3rd at Epita Smash Arena 2, the largest tournament in Europe at the time, defeating top ranked Japanese player, Masashi, before losing to Ryota "Captain Jack" Yoshida.

In 2009, Lindgren had firmly established himself as the strongest player in Europe and decided to enter GENESIS, a tournament held in Antioch, California which was attended by the best players in the larger and more prominent American community. Many Americans did not expect Armada to do well, but he shocked the country by reaching the finals of the tournament, upsetting top American players such as Mew2King and Mang0. Armada would eventually lose in Grand Finals to Mang0, but GENESIS established Armada as a legitimate contender for best in the world and was the start of a prolific rivalry between Armada and Mang0.

Each passing year, Lindgren was ranked progressively higher. In July 2011, Armada won the major tournament at the time, GENESIS 2, defeating number one ranked player, Mang0. Lindgren remained undefeated worldwide for two years until EVO 2013 where he lost the title and 1st rank back to Mang0.

After Apex 2013, Armada announced his retirement from competitive Melee although he did return to compete in EVO 2013, where he placed 4th, losing to PPMD 0–2 in winners' bracket and being eliminated by Mang0 0–2 in losers' semis. He returned to the scene a year later, with B.E.A.S.T, a tournament held in his hometown of Gothenburg which he helped to organize, as his first tournament back.

Lindgren also had a fairly short-lived, but very successful career in Project M, winning Apex 2014's Project M title by defeating Mew2King in grand finals. On 6 November 2014 he left Empire Arcadia and became sponsored by professional gaming team Alliance.

Lindgren initially showed some interest in Super Smash Bros. for Wii U stating that he found it considerably different from Melee and felt that he needed to spend more time playing it, but has not publicly practiced or competed in the game since a short time after its release. Since 2015, Armada has switched from using only Peach to both Peach and Fox in tournaments. He cites Fox's ability to put mental pressure on opponents as a reason for this change. Armada faced PPMD in the Grand Finals of Apex 2015, while coming from the losers bracket, but eventually lost after forcing a bracket reset. Armada was the EVO 2015 Melee champion after defeating Hungrybox in the Finals. By winning EVO, Lindgren received the largest single prize ever awarded in a Melee tournament at that time.

After winning EVO 2015, Melee It On Me (MIOM) ranked Armada as the best Melee player for the 2015 Summer SSBMRank, ahead of Leffen and Mang0.

At The Big House 5 in Dearborn, Michigan, Armada and his Europe crew lost to SoCal, placing 2nd. In doubles, Armada won with his brother Android, beating Mew2King and Hungrybox in Grand Finals. In Singles, he beat Hungrybox 3–2 in Grand Finals to win the tournament.
Armada was ranked the number one player in the world on the Melee it On Me (MIOM) year end SSBMRank for 2015.

Armada continued his tournament success in 2016 and 2017, winning events such as GENESIS 3, Dreamhack Winter 2016, GENESIS 4, and EVO 2017 as well as a multitude of doubles events with his teammate and brother Android. In addition, Armada won the first four iterations of the highly prestigious invitational tournament series Smash Summit. In doing so, Armada became the first Melee player to win the same major tournament series three and four times consecutively.

Armada's lowest placing in his entire Melee career, excluding tournaments which he forfeit or did not seriously compete, is 5th place at both Paragon Orlando 2015 and Get On My Level 2016.

Armada retired from competing in Melee singles on 18 September 2018.

Speedrunning career

Armada began speedrunning the 70 star category of Super Mario 64 in 2020 and currently places 20th in the world.

Personal life

Lindgren has 10 siblings, two of whom, Alexander "Aniolas" and Andreas "Android", also play Melee competitively. Lindgren formerly worked as a substitute teacher in Gothenburg, but now dedicates his time fully to competing, producing YouTube videos, and streaming on Twitch.

Armada is one of the subjects of the sequel of the documentary The Smash Brothers by producer Travis "Samox" Beauchamp, and its sequel entitled Metagame, which was released on 11 December 2020. The project raised over 30,000 on Kickstarter.

Notable tournament placings
Only Majors and Supermajors are listed.

Super Smash Bros. Melee

Project M

Super Smash Bros. for Wii U

References

External links

1993 births
Living people
Swedish esports players
Super Smash Bros. Melee players
Twitch (service) streamers
Video game speedrunners
People from Gothenburg
Alliance (esports) players
Empire Arcadia players
Team Razer players
Project M players